Dilek Kalayci (Demirel, formerly Kolat, born 7 February 1967) is a Turkish-German politician of the Social Democratic Party (SPD) who served as State Minister for Health, Care and Equality (2016–2021) and as Deputy Governing Mayor of Berlin and State Minister for Labour, Integration and Women (2014–2016) in the government of Mayor Michael Müller.

Early life and education 
Kalayci has lived in Germany since was three years old.

Kalayci studied Mathematical economics at the Technical University of Berlin, after that she worked at the Deutsche Kreditbank.

Political career 
From 1995 until 1999, Kalayci was a member of the borough council of Schöneberg and the deputy leader of the SPD group in the council.

In the 2001 state elections, Kalayci won the Tempelhof-Schöneberg 3 constituency with 39.6% of the vote. She was able to defend her constituency in all subsequent elections. Between 2006 and 2011, Kalayci was the deputy leader of the SPD group in the Berlin Abgeordenetenhaus.

In November 2011 Berlin's Governing Mayor, Klaus Wowereit appointed Kalayci State Minister for Labour, Integration and Women, a post she held until 2016. After Wowereit's resignation in 2014 and Michael Müller's election as Governing Mayor she succeeded him as Deputy Governing Mayor in December 2014.

After the 2016 state elections, Kalayci became State Minister for Health, Care and Equality in December 2016, she was not reappointed Deputy Governing Mayor, being succeeded by the Green Party politician Ramona Pop.

As one of the state’s representatives at the Bundesrat from 2011 until 2021, Kalayci was a member of the Committee on Health. She was also a member of the German-Russian Friendship Group set up by the Bundesrat and the Russian Federation Council.

Other activities

Corporate boards
 Berliner Sparkasse, Member of the Advisory Board
 Vivantes, Ex-Officio Member of the Supervisory Board (2016–2021)

Non-profit organizations
 Deutsches Herzzentrum Berlin, Member of the Board of Trustees
 German-Israeli Association (DIG), Member
 Kaiserin Friedrich-Stiftung für das ärztliche Fortbildungswesen, member of the board of trustees
 German United Services Trade Union (ver.di), member
 Checkpoint Charlie Museum, Member of the Board of Trustees

Personal life 
Kalayci lives in Berlin's Lichterfelde district. From 1989 until 2017 she was married to Kenan Kolat, and in 2019 she married Hivzi Kalayci.

References 

1967 births
Living people
Senators of Berlin
Members of the Abgeordnetenhaus of Berlin
German people of Turkish descent
Social Democratic Party of Germany politicians
20th-century German politicians
21st-century German politicians
Technical University of Berlin alumni
20th-century German women politicians
21st-century German women politicians